Butterfly World is a butterfly zoo located on the Isle of Wight.

It opened on 1 May 1983 as part of the Medina Garden Centre, becoming the first butterfly farm opened in a UK garden centre, and the fifth Butterfly farm in the world.

It includes an indoor sub-tropical garden with free-flying butterflies.

References

External links 
 

Butterfly houses
Tourist attractions on the Isle of Wight
1983 establishments in the United Kingdom
Zoos established in 1983